Juana Barrera Amezcua (born 16 May 1961) is a Mexican politician from the National Action Party. In 2003 she served as Deputy of the LVIII Legislature of the Mexican Congress representing Morelos.

References

1961 births
Living people
People from Cuernavaca
Women members of the Chamber of Deputies (Mexico)
National Action Party (Mexico) politicians
21st-century Mexican politicians
21st-century Mexican women politicians
Deputies of the LVIII Legislature of Mexico
Members of the Chamber of Deputies (Mexico) for Morelos